German submarine U-346 was a Type VIIC U-boat of Nazi Germany's Kriegsmarine during World War II. She was laid down at the Nordseewerke in Emden as yard number 218 on 28 October 1942, launched on 13 April 1943 and commissioned on 7 June of the same year under the command of Oberleutnant zur See Arno Leisten. She had been built for operations during the Battle of the Atlantic, but was the victim of an accident before she started operations.

Design
German Type VIIC submarines were preceded by the shorter Type VIIB submarines. U-346 had a displacement of  when at the surface and  while submerged. She had two shafts and two  propellers.

U-346 was fitted with five  torpedo tubes (four fitted at the bow and one at the stern), fourteen torpedoes, one  SK C/35 naval gun, 220 rounds, and two twin  C/30 anti-aircraft guns. The boat had a complement of between forty-four and sixty.

Service history
On 20 September 1943, the boat was undergoing diving trials as part of the 8th U-boat flotilla in Danzig Bay in the Baltic Sea; an unknown mechanical fault occurred, sending the submarine into a crash dive from which she never recovered, descending to the bottom of the bay, where she and her crew remain to this day. 37 people died on U-346, but unfortunately for the Kriegsmarine, the personnel aboard the boat were not regular U-boat crew, but a combination of the ship's officers (who were all killed), and dockyard experts on submarine operating systems (six of whom escaped the wreck), whose loss was far more severe than the loss of the boat of its crew, had they been aboard.

References

Bibliography

External links

German Type VIIC submarines
U-boat lost in diving accidents
World War II submarines of Germany
World War II shipwrecks in the Baltic Sea
U-boats commissioned in 1943
1943 ships
U-boats sunk in 1943
Ships built in Emden
Maritime incidents in September 1943